Marshall Arnold (October 21, 1845 – June 12, 1913) was a U.S. Representative from Missouri.

Born at Cook Settlement, near Farmington, St. Francois County, Missouri, Arnold attended the common schools.
Professor at Arcadia College in 1870 and 1871.
Deputy clerk of the circuit, county, and probate courts of St. Francois County, Missouri.
He studied law.
He was admitted to the bar in 1872 and commenced practice in Commerce, Missouri.
He served as prosecuting attorney of Scott County in 1873–1876.
He served as member of the State house of representatives in 1877–1879.

Arnold was elected as a Democrat to the Fifty-second and Fifty-third Congresses (March 4, 1891 – March 3, 1895).
He was an unsuccessful candidate for reelection in 1894 to the Fifty-fourth Congress.
He resumed the practice of law in Benton, Missouri, and died there June 12, 1913.
He was interred in Benton Cemetery.

References

1845 births
1913 deaths
People from Scott County, Missouri
Democratic Party members of the Missouri House of Representatives
Democratic Party members of the United States House of Representatives from Missouri
19th-century American politicians